The Golden Section is a 1983 album by English musician John Foxx. A progression from the sound of The Garden (1981), Foxx called The Golden Section "a roots check: Beatles, Church music, Psychedelia, The Shadows, The Floyd, The Velvets, Roy Orbison, Kraftwerk, and cheap pre-electro Europop".
The album was Foxx's first work with a producer since his final Ultravox album, Systems of Romance, in 1978; The Golden Section was co-produced by Zeus B. Held, well known in the Krautrock scene of the 1970s. In addition to Foxx's wide array of synthesizers, the production made extensive use of vocoder effects and sampling, along with traditional rock guitar.

Production and style
Foxx's two previous solo albums, Metamatic (1980) and The Garden (1981), had included a number of compositions written for earlier projects but shelved for one reason or another, such as "He's a Liquid" and "Touch and Go", originally performed live with Ultravox, and "Systems of Romance" and "Walk Away", written during sessions for the album Systems of Romance. In contrast The Golden Section was almost wholly made up of material written especially for the album in 1983, the exceptions being "Like a Miracle" an earlier version of which was recorded during the Metamatic sessions and released on the deluxe edition of that album, and "Endlessly", an early version of which Foxx had released as a single in mid-1982. Another eight songs he recorded around the same time as "Endlessly", that were to have formed an album, were scrapped.

The album's psychedelic rock flavour was evident on tracks like "Someone" and "Endlessly". The latter was described by Trouser Press as "the album's clear standout, a magnificent multi-level pop creation". "Ghosts on Water" opened with vocal samples from the embers of "Endlessly", the preceding track on the album.  It utilised sitar, backwards cymbals, a shehnai, and a reversed string arrangement at the end, set to an adaptation of The Beatles' "Tomorrow Never Knows" drum pattern.

"Sitting at the Edge of the World" evoked sounds from "Strawberry Fields Forever", whilst "Running Across Thin Ice With Tigers" utilised Beatlesque harmonies and the sound of a tiger's roar. The final track, "Twilight's Last Gleaming", shared its title with a 1977 World War III film, a William S. Burroughs short story, and a phrase from "The Star-Spangled Banner", though it did not overtly reference any of them.

Release and aftermath
The Golden Section spent three weeks in the UK charts, peaking at #27. "Endlessly", released as a single in July 1982 in a different mix to the album version, made #66 in the UK. "Your Dress" was issued concurrently with the album in September 1983, reaching #61. The album's final single, "Like a Miracle", was released in October but did not chart. Foxx embarked on a tour to promote the album in late 1983, and live recordings from the Dominion and Lyceum Theatres in London were released in 2002 as part of the double concert CD The Golden Section Tour + The Omnidelic Exotour.

Track listing
All songs written by John Foxx.

 "My Wild Love" – 3:45
 "Someone" – 3:30
 "Your Dress" – 4:26
 "Running Across Thin Ice With Tigers" – 5:37
 "Sitting at the Edge of the World" – 4:23
 "Endlessly" – 4:18
 "Ghosts on Water" – 3:12
 "Like a Miracle" – 5:10
 "The Hidden Man" – 5:44
 "Twilight's Last Gleaming" – 4:24 Produced by Mike Howlett

2001 reissue bonus tracks

<LI> "Dance With Me" – 3:29
<LI> "The Lifting Sky" – 4:48
<LI> "Annexe" – 3:10
<LI> "Wings and a Wind" – 5:15
<LI> "A Kind of Wave" – 3:37
<LI> "A Woman on a Stairway" – 4:29

2008 reissue bonus disc

 "Endlessly" (single version) – 3:52
 "My Wild Love" (early version) – 2:48
 "A Long Time" (alternative version) – 5:04
 "Annexe" – 3:10
 "Sitting at the Edge of the World" (alternative version) – 3:59
 "A Kind of Wave" – 3:38
 "Twilight's Last Gleaming" (early version) – 3:51
 "Running Across Thin Ice With Tigers" (extended mix) – 5:50
 "A Woman on a Stairway" – 4:26
 "The Lifting Sky" – 4:50
 "Shine on Me" – 3:46
 "Young Man" – 2:56
 "Wings and a Wind" – 5:17
 "The Hidden Man" (alternative version) – 4:41
 "Dance With Me" – 3:30
 "Endlessly" (alternative extended mix) – 6:03

The extended mix of "Endlessly" is a different one to that released on the "Endlessly" twelve inch single prior to the album's release.

Personnel
 Kevin Armstrong – guitar
 Blair Cunningham – drums
 Jo Dworniak – bass
 John Foxx – vocals, guitar, keyboards, Magnetic Choir
 Zeus B. Held – keyboards
 Mike Howlett – bass, drums
 J. J. Jeczalik – Fairlight CMI programming
 James Risborough – choirboy
 Robin Simon – guitar
 Paul "Wix" Wickens – drums, keyboards

See also

Golden ratio

Notes

1983 albums
John Foxx albums
Virgin Records albums